The list of shipwrecks in 1943 includes ships sunk, foundered, grounded, or otherwise lost during 1943.

January

February

March

April

May

June

July

August

September

October

November

December

Unknown date

See also 
 List of shipwrecks

References

1943
Shipwrecks